Rebecca Cliffe (born May 15, 1990) is a British zoologist and one of the leading experts on sloth biology and ecology. She is the Founder and Executive Director of The Sloth Conservation Foundation and author of the book Sloths: Life in the Slow Lane with photographs by award-winning wildlife photographer Suzi Eszterhas.

Early years and work 

Cliffe was born in 1990 in Preston, England. Cliffe received her bachelor’s degree in Zoology from the University of Manchester. She later went on to obtain a PhD in Bioscience (specializing in sloths) from Swansea University. As part of her PhD research, she conducted the longest recorded study on wild sloth ecology (The Sloth Backpack Project).

She has published various studies on the ecology, biology, and physiology of sloths which have provided new insights about these poorly understood species. Due to her in-depth research and first-hand observations in the field she is considered to be an expert on sloths and their behavior.

She was featured in the Discovery Channel series “Meet the Sloths.” She also was a part of the documentary "72 Dangerous Animals: Latin America” and featured in Animal Planet’s “Too Cute! Baby Sloths.”

Recent work 
In 2017, Cliffe founded The Sloth Conservation Foundation a registered non-profit organisation that is dedicated to saving sloths in the wild and has served as Executive Director since its inception. She continues to publish research on the biology, ecology and physiology of sloths.

References

External links 
 The Sloth Conservation Foundation

Women zoologists
Scientists from Preston, Lancashire
1990 births
21st-century British zoologists
Sloths
Alumni of the University of Manchester
Alumni of Swansea University
Living people
English women biologists